Scott Alan Spellmon (born November 2, 1963) is a lieutenant general in the United States Army who currently serves as the 55th Chief of Engineers and the commanding general of the United States Army Corps of Engineers.

Early life and education
Raised in Bloomingdale, New Jersey, Spellmon graduated from Butler High School in 1982. He then attended the United States Military Academy, graduating with a Bachelor of Science in 1986 and commissioning into the Army Corps of Engineers. Spellmon also has received master's degrees from both the United States Army War College and the University of Illinois. Spellmon is the first person to hold the position of Chief of Engineers and commanding general of the Army Corps of Engineers since October 2000 without a Professional Engineering License.

Military career
In January 2020, President Donald Trump nominated Spellmon to succeed Lieutenant General Todd T. Semonite as the 55th Chief of Engineers. Spellmon was confirmed by congress and officially assumed duties on September 10, 2020.

References

Living people
People from Bloomingdale, New Jersey
United States Military Academy alumni
United States Army Corps of Engineers personnel
University of Illinois alumni
United States Army generals
United States Army Corps of Engineers Chiefs of Engineers
1963 births
Military personnel from New Jersey